Charopinesta sema, also known as the Blackburn Island pinhead snail, is a species of land snail that is endemic to Australia's Lord Howe Island group in the Tasman Sea.

Description
The depressedly turbinate to discoidal shell of the mature snail is 1.1 mm in height, with a diameter of 1.8 mm, and a low, stepped spire. It is pale golden in colour. The whorls are rounded, with deeply impressed sutures and moderately spaced radial ribs. It has a roundedly lunate aperture and widely open umbilicus.

Distribution and habitat
This extremely rare snail is known from a single empty shell from Blackburn Island. It may be extinct.

References

 
 

 
sema
Gastropods of Lord Howe Island
Taxa named by Tom Iredale
Gastropods described in 1944
Species known from a single specimen